Khuru may refer to:

 Khuru (sport), a traditional Bhutanese sport
 Khuru, Bhutan, a town in Bhutan
 Khuru, Fars, a village in Iran
 Khuru, Isfahan, a village in Iran